SS Tum Tum was a Steamship used to move building stone from the granite quarry on the lake shore south of Vernon, BC. She had a total of 8 horsepower. Some speculate she was the Skookum alias Tut Tut with a slight name change as they were similar in number of horsepower.

See also

References

Steamships of Canada
Tugboats of Canada